Monro, Inc. is an automotive services company founded and headquartered in Rochester, New York, U.S. As of 2021, Monro has 1,288 locations making them the second-largest automotive services company in North America after Driven Brands by number of locations and by revenue.

Company history

Early history
The company was founded by Charles J. August in 1957, originally as a franchise of another company, Midas Muffler.

In the mid-1960s, "Chuck" August decided that his muffler shops should offer an expanded list of services. This was not in line with the other organization's wishes. In 1966, he discontinued his affiliation with Midas Muffler. August launched a new muffler service company under the name Monro Muffler with his brother, Burton S. August, and Sheldon Lane. August named the new company after Monroe County, New York, but without the "e" at the end of the name.  August added brake services several years later and renamed the company, Monro Muffler Brake, Inc.

Monro began a deliberate course of prudent expansion, arriving at 20 stores by 1977. They had a warehouse on West Henrietta Road. By the end of 1979, they had about 43 stores in New York. From this warehouse, drivers would load the trucks and deliver to all the 43 stores throughout New York. Afterwards, a more aggressive expansion program was instituted when the company began to make a number of large acquisitions. By the mid-1980s, there were 59 stores which generated $21 million in sales annually. Most of those locations were in upstate New York.

Expansion

In 1984, the company's founder, Charles J. August  sold his controlling interest in Monro Muffler and Brake to a New York City-based investors group headed by Donald Glickman and Peter J. Solomon. August remained on the company's board of directors until 2002.

In 1991, Monro Muffler made its initial public offering. Monro's stock began trading on NASDAQ under the symbol "MNRO".

Under the leadership of Robert G. Gross, who joined the company in 1998 as president and CEO and currently serves as executive chairman, Monro aggressively expanded outside of its traditional base in upstate New York. In September 1998, the company successfully purchased all 205 Speedy Muffler King locations within the United States from Speedy Muffler King, Inc. of Toronto, Canada. In 2004, Monro purchased the 25 stores and 10 kiosks of Mr. Tire, a Baltimore, Maryland chain which trademarked "On the Rim and Out the Door" pricing. Later that year, Monro bought five Rice Tire locations and rebranded them as Mr. Tire Auto Service Centers. Monro now operates 132 Mr. Tire outlets.

In 2006, Monro obtained 75 ProCare shops from bankruptcy, converting 44 to Monro Muffler Brake & Service centers and 31 to Mr. Tire outlets; the shops had previously been owned by Standard Oil of Ohio and BP prior to their bankruptcy. In fiscal 2010, the company purchased the 26 Autotire stores in Missouri and Illinois, its first venture into the mid-West, and the 41 Tire Warehouse Central stores in Massachusetts, Rhode Island, Vermont and New Hampshire. Fiscal 2011 began with the acquisition of Import Export Tire Co., five retail tire and auto repair stores in the Pittsburgh, Pennsylvania metro region, and Courthouse Tire, three tire and undercar care facilities in the Fredericksburg, Virginia area whose sales substantially declined after the acquisition.

In fiscal 2012, the company acquired eight local auto service and retail groups, including Tire Barn Warehouse, 31 stores in Indiana, Illinois and Tennessee, and Ken Towery's Tire & AutoCare, 27 stores in Kentucky and Indiana, two chains that Monro continues to manage under the local brand names. This is also true of Curry's Auto Service In Virginia and Maryland, a 10-store acquisition in fiscal 2013. That year, the company also purchased four S&S Firestone stores in Kentucky and six Carl King Tire Stores in Delaware and Maryland.

Monro entered three new states with major acquisitions in 2014: Michigan - Lentz USA/Kan Rock Tire, 19 stores; Florida - The Tire Choice & Total Car Care, 35 stores; Gold Coast Tire & Auto Centers, 9 stores; and Martino Tire, 8 stores; and, Georgia - Wood & Fullerton, 9 stores. The company operates its Florida stores under the Tire Choice brand name.

In fiscal 2015, the company purchased the Car-X trade name and franchise rights to 146 locations in Illinois, Wisconsin, Iowa, Minnesota, and Texas. In 2016, Monro purchased Clark Tire & Auto Inc., which operated 26 stores in North Carolina, as well as six other companies: Kwik-Fit Tire & Service Inc. in Sandy Springs, Ga.; three Excel Auto & Tire stores, in Rochester, Eagan and Spring Lake Park, Minn., operated by Task Holdings Inc., and single store operated by Autopar Inc.; Harlow Tire Co. in Westland, Mich.; two Express Tire Centers L.L.C. stores, in Hillsboro and Millford, N.H.; and Pioneer Tire Pros in Riverview, Fla. Since 2000, Monro has made more than 30 acquisitions totaling more than 500 stores and producing revenue of 650 million.

Under Monro's current interim CEO Robert E . Mellor, the company continues to pursue a growth strategy of increased market share through incremental store sales, low-cost acquisitions, and strategic new store openings.

Monro serviced 6.2 million vehicles in 2019 and posted record sales of $1.2 billion, record net income of $79 million, and earnings of $2.41 per share. The company operates under several regional brands, most acquired in the past 15 years, including: Monro Auto Service & Tire Centers, Mr. Tire Auto Service Centers, Tread Quarters Discount Tire Auto Service Centers, Autotire Car Care Centers, Ken Towery's Tire & AutoCare, The Tire Choice & Total Car Care, Tire Warehouse Tires for Less, and Tire Barn Warehouse.

In 2019, Monro entered the West Coast market with the acquisition of 51 stores in California, including Certified Tire and Service Centers, Skip's Tire & Auto Repair Centers, Lloyd's Tire & Auto Care, and Trusted Tire & Service.[5] In addition, the company acquired 20 stores in Louisiana,  including Allied Discount Tire, Atlas Tire & Auto, Scotty's Tire & Auto, Twin Tire & Automotive, and T-Boys Tire and Auto, and the 14 Superior Tire stores in Nevada and Idaho, bringing Monro's store total to 1,288 in 32 states.

In 2020, Ides Capital suggested that Monro's lack of diversity on its board and workforce was limiting the company's future growth.

Monro Auto Service and Tire Centers 

Monro Auto Service and Tire Centers  is an American automotive service company focusing on scheduled maintenance, undercar repairs, and retail tire sales. Monro Auto Service and Tire Centers is named for Monroe County, New York, without the "e." It is the flagship brand of Monro, Inc. As of 2022, there are a total of 402 Monro locations in 14 states.

References

American companies established in 1957
Retail companies established in 1957
1984 mergers and acquisitions
Automotive repair shops of the United States
Companies based in Rochester, New York
Companies listed on the Nasdaq
1957 establishments in New York (state)